Garnot may refer to:

 Prosper Garnot (1794–1838), French surgeon and naturalist.
 Jean Sainte-Fare Garnot (1908–1963), French Egyptologist.
 Garnot's House Gecko, another name for the Indo-Pacific gecko.